Orania serotina is a species of sea snail, a marine gastropod mollusk in the family Muricidae, the murex snails or rock snails.

Description

Distribution
This species is distributed in the Indian Ocean along the Aldabra Atoll

References

 Taylor, J.D. (1973). Provisional list of the mollusca of Aldabra Atoll

External links
 Gastropods.com : Morula squamilirata; accessed : 19 December 2010

Gastropods described in 1853
Orania (gastropod)